Tod Hiro Mikuriya (20 September 193320 May 2007) was an American medical doctor and psychiatrist. Known as an outspoken advocate for the use of cannabis for medical purposes and its legalization, he is often regarded as the grandfather of the medical cannabis movement in the United States.

Personal life
Mikuriya was born in Fallsington, Pennsylvania, from German teacher Anna Schwenk and civil engineer Tadafumi Mikuriya, an Issei descendant of the Japanese samurai nobility. 

Growing up in the Quaker community of Fallsington, Pennsylvania and attending Quaker schools (George School, Haverford College) it was the compromise chosen by his parents that the three Mikuriya children were raised as Quakers. "The Quakers were proprietors of the Underground Railway, I’m proud to say. The cannabis prohibition has the same dynamics  as the bigotry and racism my family and I experienced starting on 7 December 1941, when we were transformed from normal-but-different people into war-criminal surrogates." In a 1998 interview, Mikuriya (whose father was a converted Christian and whose mother a follower of the Baháʼí Faith), made a connection between his family background and his views in relation to cannabis. Mikuriya claimed he first heard of cannabis in a children's book in 1959.

In 1951, Mikuriya graduated from a private Quaker preparatory school. He graduated a bachelor’s degree from Reed College in 1956 and was drafted into the Army the following year. Mikuriya served at Brooke Army Hospital psychiatric ward before graduating his medical degree in 1962 at Temple University, with an internship at Southern Pacific Hospital (San Francisco) and residencies in psychiatry at Oregon State Hospital and at Mendocino State Hospital.

Mikuriya died at his home in Berkeley, California on 20 May 2007, aged 73, after a long battle with cancer.

Professional career
Mikuriya first directed a center for the treatment of drug addiction in Princeton, New Jersey (1966–1967) before being appointed director of non-classified marijuana research for the National Institute of Mental Health Center for Narcotics and Drug Abuse Studies in 1967.

In the late 1960s and early 1970s, he authored a number of academic publications creating the debate on the therapeutic use of cannabis within the medical community, including proposing cannabis as a substitution agent as well as on issues related to the legality of cannabis.

His 1972 self-published book Marijuana Medical Papers 1839–1972 became a landmark in the modern movement for the legalization of Medical marijuana. Collected from the reference section at the National Library of Medicine it was saved from complete oblivion. Much to the irritation of cannabis prohibitionists, this medical intelligence has been restored for possible alternative medical applications. Mikuriya continued publicating in the 1970s and 1980s.

Clinical practice 
Until his death in May 2007, he continued in private psychiatric practice limited to cannabis clinical consultation. He approved marijuana for medical purposes in over nine thousand patients, not solely in terminal cases, but also alleviation of physical and emotional pain in non-terminal cases. The legal situation is extremely complex (see legal history of marijuana in the United States). 

His practices are controversial and have drawn him into conflict with authorities. He was on five years probation with the Medical Board of California resulting from prosecutorial manipulation and conspiracy with local, state, and federal law enforcement vendetta starting in 2000. No patients were harmed. There were no complaints from patients, families or community physicians. Only law enforcement in eleven rural northern California counties responded to solicitation by Medical Board investigators and officials in the California Attorney General's office.

Political involvement 
Mikuriya vas involved early on in political and civil movements focused on changing cannabis laws. In 1971, Mikuriya joined the group Amorphia, "a special interest group that was spearheading the California Marijuana Initiative." He took part in the redaction of the failed California Prop. 19 in 1972, and helped Dennis Peron redact San Francisco's Prop P which passed in 1991.

He is maybe more known for his involvement on 1996 California Proposition 215. He declared: "As one of the authors of the Prop 215, my claim to fame is getting the phrase ‘for any other condition that Cannabis is helpful’ included."

In 1980, he ran in the House of Representatives elections as a member of the Libertarian Party, against incumbent Ron Dellums, a Democrat, and Republican Charles V. Hughes for California's 8th congressional district seat. He lost, with 10,465 votes, to Dellums' 108,380 and Hughes' 76,580.

Creation of the Society of Cannabis Clinicians 
In 1999, Mikuriya founded the California Cannabis Research Medical Group to help physicians share and exchange data about cannabis use by their patients. In 2004, the CCRMG formed the Society of Cannabis Clinicians (SCC) to facilitate voluntary medical standards for physician-approved cannabis under California law (HSC §11362.5).

References

External links
Dr. Mikuriya's personal website including personal photographs showing various stages of his career
Official site of the Society of Cannabis Clinicians
O'Shaughnessy's Journal

Further reading

1933 births
2007 deaths
American Quakers
Cannabis researchers
People from Pennsylvania
Writers from Berkeley, California
Deaths from cancer in California
American people of Japanese descent
American cannabis activists
Cannabis in California